Elliana Pogrebinsky (born April 22, 1998) is a retired American competitive ice dancer. With Alex Benoit, she is a two-time ISU Challenger Series Tallinn Trophy bronze medalist (2016, 2017), the 2016 Lake Placid Ice Dance International champion, and the 2017 U.S. national pewter medalist.

Personal life 
Elliana Pogrebinsky was born April 22, 1998 in Los Gatos, California. She is the daughter of Natalia and Vladimir Pogrebinsky, and has an elder brother, Daniel. Her parents moved to the United States in the late 1980s from Odessa, Ukraine. She is Jewish and celebrated her bat mitzvah in 2011.

As a child, Pogrebinsky studied at a ballet school in San Jose, California and competed in ballroom dancing and in rhythmic gymnastics, winning a Pacific Region title and qualifying for three national championships at three levels. After moving from California to Maryland in 2009, she attended Westland Middle School and Bethesda-Chevy Chase High School. In 2016, she graduated from FlexTech Academy in Novi, Michigan. She is now enrolled at the University of San Francisco pursuing a bachelor's degree in Kinesiology and has an internship at the athletic department in Strength and Conditioning at USF.

Career

Early years 
Pogrebinsky began skating as a three-year-old in San Jose. From 2005 to 2009, she was coached by Marina Klimova and Sergei Ponomarenko in California.

Pogrebinsky teamed up with Ross Gudis in March 2009. They were coached by Alexei Kiliakov, Elena Novak, and Dmytri Ilin in Wheaton and Rockville, Maryland. Making their ISU Junior Grand Prix debut, they placed 6th in Lake Placid, New York and 11th in Bled, Slovenia in 2012, before placing 5th in junior dance at the 2013 U.S. Championships. In the 2013–14 season, they competed at two more JGP events – finishing 4th in Riga, Latvia, and 6th in Gdańsk, Poland – and placed 5th for the second year in a row at the U.S. Championships.

Partnership with Benoit 
Pogrebinsky teamed up with Alex Benoit in March 2014 after a tryout in Novi, Michigan that was suggested by Igor Shpilband. Their international debut came at the 2014–15 ISU Junior Grand Prix (JGP) in Aichi; after placing fifth in Japan, Pogrebinsky/Benoit were sent to the JGP in Zagreb, Croatia, where they finished 8th. In January 2015, they won the junior bronze medal at the 2015 U.S. Championships and were selected to compete at the 2015 World Junior Championships in Tallinn. Ranked 12th in the short dance, they qualified for the free dance (14th) and finished 13th overall in Estonia.

During the 2015–16 ISU Junior Grand Prix series, Pogrebinsky/Benoit placed fourth in Linz, Austria, and won the bronze medal in Logroño, Spain. They repeated as junior national bronze medalists and were assigned to the 2016 World Junior Championships in Debrecen, Hungary; they placed fifth in the short dance, fourth in the free, and fourth overall.

Pogrebinsky/Benoit decided to compete on the senior level in the 2016–2017 season. Making their Grand Prix debut, they placed 7th at the 2016 Skate America and 6th at the 2016 Rostelecom Cup. They won bronze at the 2016 CS Tallinn Trophy and then the pewter medal (fourth place) at the 2017 U.S. Championships.

In their second senior season, the two finished 7th at both of their Grand Prix assignments and took bronze at the 2017 CS Tallinn Trophy before placing 7th at the 2018 U.S. Championships. Their coaches included Igor Shpilband, Adrienne Lenda, Greg Zuerlein, and Fabian Bourzat. In March 2018, Benoit announced his decision to retire from competitive skating while Pogrebinsky said that she would search for another partner.

Programs

With Benoit

With Gudis

Competitive highlights 
GP: Grand Prix; CS: Challenger Series; JGP: Junior Grand Prix

With Benoit

With Gudis

References

External links 
 
 

1998 births
American female ice dancers
American people of Ukrainian-Jewish descent
Living people
People from Los Gatos, California
People from Bethesda, Maryland
Bethesda-Chevy Chase High School alumni
21st-century American women